The Rural City of Warragul was a local government area about  east-southeast of Melbourne, the state capital of Victoria, Australia.

History

Originally part of the Shire of Buln Buln, Warragul was first incorporated as a shire on 9 December 1881. It annexed part of the Western Riding of the Shire of Narracan on 30 May 1906. On 17 August 1990, Warragul was proclaimed a rural city, one of the first in Victoria under the provisions of the Local Government Act 1989.

On 2 December 1994, the Rural City of Warragul was abolished, and along with the Shires of Buln Buln and Narracan, and parts of the Shire of Upper Yarra, was merged into the newly created Shire of Baw Baw.

Wards

The Rural City of Warragul was divided into four wards, each of which elected three councillors:
 North Ward
 South Ward
 Central East Ward
 Central West Ward

Towns and localities
 Bona Vista
 Brandy Creek
 Bull Swamp
 Buln Buln
 Cloverlea
 Darnum
 Ellinbank
 Ferndale
 Gainsborough
 Lillico
 Nilma
 Rokeby
 Seaview
 Tetoora Road
 Warragul*
 Warragul South

* Council seat.

Population

* Estimate in the 1958 Victorian Year Book.

References

External links
 Victorian Places - Warragul Shire and Rural City

Warragul